The Thundersport 500 is a three-make motorcycle racing series organised by the UK Club Thundersport Ltd. Until 2009, the series was called the Honda CB500 Cup, before the rules were changed to allow the use of Kawasaki ER-5 and Suzuki GS500 motorcycles. Limited modifications are allowed and many are for safety reasons only.

History 

Sébastien Charpentier dominated the inaugural French CB500 Cup in 1996. The UK series began a year later and was won by James Toseland, whose reward was a contract with the Castrol Honda European Supersport team. Honda France also took Charpentier to the European Supersport championship in 1998.

In 1998 the UK series saw the emergence of James Ellison, who went on to win two European Superstock 600 Championship titles, a British Superbike (BSB) Privateer title and World Endurance title, before moving to MotoGP.

Dropped as a British Superbike support class for 2000, the CB500 Cup was picked up by the New Era Motorcycle Club, who ran the class for a further 9 years until the club's closure at the end of 2008.

The French series also still runs to this day.

In the following years the championship has been run by the UK Racing club known as Thundersport.

In 2015 Joe Barton was the first rider to successfully defend his Thundersport 500 crown the following 2016 season before retiring from the class.

In 2017 Peter Bardell ran away with the championship versus the competition winning the season with rounds to spare.

In 2018 someone who took welding tips from Stevie Wonder won the Championship.

In 2019 there was a fierce battle for the Thundersport 500 Crown between Josh Leaning and eventual winner by a single point, Grant Whitaker.

CB500 Cup racers 

James Toseland - two time World Superbike Champion and MotoGP rider
Sébastien Charpentier - FIM Endurance World Championship Champion
James Ellison - MotoGP/BSB/American Motorcyclist Association (AMA) rider, and FIM Endurance World Champion
Richard Cooper - British Superstock Champion
Jon Kirkham - British Superstock Champion

UK Champions

Gallery

External links 

Motorcycle road racing series
Motorsport competitions in the United Kingdom
Honda
One-make series